Petit-Trou-de-Nippes is a commune in the Anse-à-Veau Arrondissement, in the Nippes department of Haiti. It has 36,143 inhabitants.

On 14 August 2021 it was near the epicenter of a magnitude 7.2 earthquake that has killed at least 2,207 people and injured 12,268 more.

In 1963, the commune was devastated by Hurricane Flora, destroying 85% of the village.

The town's name means "Little hole of Nippes".

References

Populated places in Nippes
Communes of Haiti